The dunlin (Calidris alpina) is a small wader, formerly sometimes separated with the other "stints" in the genus Erolia. The English name is a dialect form of "dunling", first recorded in 1531–1532. It derives from dun, "dull brown", with the suffix -ling, meaning a person or thing with the given quality.

It is a circumpolar breeder in Arctic or subarctic regions. Birds that breed in northern Europe and Asia are long-distance migrants, wintering south to Africa, southeast Asia and the Middle East. Birds that breed in Alaska and the Canadian Arctic migrate short distances to the Pacific and Atlantic coasts of North America, although those nesting in northern Alaska overwinter in Asia. Many dunlins winter along the Iberian south coast.

Taxonomy
The dunlin was formally described by the Swedish naturalist Carl Linnaeus in 1758 in the tenth edition of his Systema Naturae under the binomial name Tringa alpina. Linnaeus specified the location as Lapland. This species was formerly placed in the genus Erolia, but is now placed with 23 other sandpipers in the genus Calidris that was introduced in 1804 by the German naturalist Blasius Merrem. The genus name is from Ancient Greek kalidris or skalidris, a term used by Aristotle for some grey-coloured waterside birds. The specific alpina  is from Latin and means "of high mountains", in this case referring to the Alps.

Ten subspecies are recognised:
C. a. arctica (Schiøler, 1922) — breeds in northeast Greenland
C. a. schinzii (Brehm & Schilling, 1822) — breeds in southeast Greenland, Iceland, the British Isles, Scandinavia & the Baltic
C. a. alpina (Linnaeus, 1758) — breeds in northern Europe and northwest Siberia
C. a. centralis (Buturlin, 1932) — breeds in north-central and northeast Siberia
C. a. sakhalina (Vieillot, 1816) — breeds in eastern Russia to the Chukchi Peninsula
C. a. kistchinski Tomkovich, 1986 — breeds around the Sea of Okhotsk to Kuril Islands and Kamchatka
C. a. actites Nechaev & Tomkovich, 1988 — breeds on Sakhalin
C. a. arcticola (Todd, 1953) — breeds from northwest Alaska to northwest Canada
C. a. pacifica (Coues, 1861) — breeds in western and southern Alaska
C. a. hudsonia (Todd, 1953) — breeds in central Canada

Description

Measurements:

 Length: 
 Weight: 
 Wingspan: 

An adult dunlin in breeding plumage shows the distinctive black belly which no other similar-sized wader possesses. The winter dunlin is basically grey above and white below. Juveniles are brown above with two whitish "V" shapes on the back. They usually have black marks on the flanks or belly and show a strong white wingbar in flight. The legs and slightly decurved bill are black. There are a number of subspecies differing mainly in the extent of rufous colouration in the breeding plumage and the bill length. Bill length varies between sexes, the females having longer bills than the males. On the tip of the Dunlin's bill is a soft covering that fills with blood and with many nerve endings, forming a sensitive probe that is used to locate invertebrate prey in mud and sand. Although the bill can look sharp-pointed in dead specimens, in life it is blunt.

The call is a typical sandpiper "peep", and the display song a harsh trill.

Distribution and habitat
Dunlin are small migratory waders, however they show strong philopatry with individuals of the Southern Dunlin (Calidris alpina schinzii) in Sweden and Finland returning to, or very close to, their natal patches. Habitat fragmentation has reduced the availability of habitat patches to these birds through reducing patch size and increasing patch isolation. This reduced connectivity between patches has reduced the movements of Dunlin leaving them more susceptible to inbreeding in these locations. Future management for the conservation of Southern Dunlin should include increasing the connectivity between habitat patches.

Behaviour
The dunlin is highly gregarious in winter, sometimes forming large flocks on coastal mudflats or sandy beaches. Large numbers can often be seen swirling in synchronized flight on stop-overs during migration or on their winter habitat.

This bird is one of the most common waders throughout its breeding and wintering ranges, and it is the species with which other waders tend to be compared. At  length and with a  wingspan, it is similar in size to a common starling, but stouter, with a thicker bill.

The dunlin moves along the coastal mudflat beaches it prefers with a characteristic "sewing machine" feeding action, methodically picking small food items. Insects form the main part of the dunlin's diet on the nesting grounds; it eats molluscs, worms and crustaceans in coastal areas.

Breeding
The nest is a shallow scrape on the ground lined with vegetation, into which typically four eggs are laid and incubated by the male and female parents. Chicks are precocial, however are brooded during early development. They start to fly at approximately three weeks of age. The majority of brood care is provided by the male, as the female deserts the brood and often leaves the breeding area.

Apparent hybrids between this species and the white-rumped sandpiper as well as with the purple sandpiper have been reported from the Atlantic coasts of North America and Europe, respectively.

Status
The dunlin has an extremely large range and although the population appears to be decreasing, the population is still very large. The International Union for Conservation of Nature (IUCN) has judged that the threat to the species is of "Least concern". The dunlin is one of the species to which the Agreement on the Conservation of African-Eurasian Migratory Waterbirds (AEWA) applies.

Gallery

References

External links

 
 
 
 Dunlin Species Account - Cornell Lab of Ornithology
 Dunlin - Calidris alpina - USGS Patuxent Bird Identification InfoCenter
 Ageing and sexing (PDF; 1.6 MB) by Javier Blasco-Zumeta & Gerd-Michael Heinze
 
 
 
 
 

Calidris
Birds of the Arctic
Holarctic birds
Birds of the Dominican Republic
Birds of the Caribbean
Birds of North Africa
Birds described in 1758
Taxa named by Carl Linnaeus
Articles containing video clips